Darband Rural District is a rural district (dehestan) in Jolgeh Sankhvast District, Jajrom County, North Khorasan Province, Iran. At the 2006 census, its population was 3,530, in 839 families.  The rural district has 10 villages.

References 

Rural Districts of North Khorasan Province
Jajrom County